Urchin Tracking Module (UTM) parameters are five variants of URL parameters used by marketers to track the effectiveness of online marketing campaigns across traffic sources and publishing media. They were introduced by Google Analytics' predecessor Urchin and, consequently, are supported out-of-the-box by Google Analytics. The UTM parameters in a URL identify the campaign that refers traffic to a specific website, and attributes the browser's website session and the sessions after that until the campaign attribution window expires to it. The parameters can be parsed by analytics tools and used to populate reports.

This example URL has four of the five UTM parameters highlighted:

 https://www.example.com/page?utm_content=buffercf3b2&utm_medium=social&utm_source=snapchat.com&utm_campaign=buffer

Use 
UTM parameters in a URL identify the marketing campaign that refers traffic to a specific website. To define and append the relevant UTM parameters to the appropriate URLs, marketers routinely use simple, spreadsheet-based, or automated UTM builder tools, including the Google Analytics URL Builder for websites. When a hyperlink contains a URL with UTM parameters, the web analytics software of the destination website interprets the parameter information and attributes it to the browser's website session and the sessions after that until the campaign attribution window has expired (by default, six months in Google Analytics).

Metrics 
UTM parameters that are passed to URLs can be parsed by analytics tools such as Google Analytics and Adobe Analytics, with the data used to populate standard and custom analytics reports. Web analytics software may attribute parameters to the browser's current and subsequent sessions until the campaign window has expired.

UTM parameters 
There are five different UTM parameters, which may be used in any order:

See also 
 
 Social media analytics

References 

Web analytics
Web log analysis software
URL
Google